The 1981 Men's European Volleyball Championship was the twelfth edition of the event, organized by Europe's governing volleyball body, the Confédération Européenne de Volleyball. It was hosted in several cities in Bulgaria, with the final round held in Varna, from September 19 to September 27, 1981.

Teams

Group A – Pazardzhik

Group B – Burgas

Group C – Varna

Preliminary round

Final round

Final ranking

References
 Results

Men's European Volleyball Championships
E
Volleyball Championship
V
September 1981 sports events in Europe
Sport in Varna, Bulgaria